Paris Live Session is an iTunes-only extended play by British singer Lily Allen released on 24 November 2009 by Regal Recordings.

Track list

References

2009 EPs
Lily Allen albums
2009 live albums
Live EPs
Jazz EPs
Pop music EPs